The Baltic Fleet (translit. Baltiyskiy flot) is the fleet of the Russian Navy in the Baltic Sea.

Established 18 May 1703, under Tsar Peter the Great as part of the Imperial Russian Navy, the Baltic Fleet is the oldest Russian Navy formation. In 1918, the fleet was inherited by the Russian SFSR which then founded the Soviet Union in 1922, where it was eventually known as the Twice Red Banner Baltic Fleet as part of the Soviet Navy, as during this period it gained the two awards of the Order of the Red Banner. Following the collapse of the Soviet Union in 1991, the Baltic Fleet was inherited by the Russian Federation and reverted to its original name as part of the Russian Navy.

The Baltic Fleet is headquartered in Kaliningrad and its main base in Baltiysk (Pillau), both in Kaliningrad Oblast, and another base in Kronstadt, Saint Petersburg, in the Gulf of Finland.

Imperial Russia
The Imperial Russian Baltic Fleet was created during the Great Northern War at the initiative of Tsar Peter the Great, who ordered the first ships for the Baltic Fleet to be constructed at Lodeynoye Pole in 1702 and 1703. The first commander was a recruited Dutch admiral, Cornelius Cruys, who in 1723 was succeeded by Count Fyodor Apraksin. In 1703, the main base of the fleet was established in Kronshtadt. One of the fleet's first actions was the taking of Shlisselburg.

In 1701 Peter the Great established a special school, the School of Mathematics and Navigation  (Russian: Школа математических и навигацких наук), situated in the Sukharev Tower in Moscow. As the territory to the west around the Gulf of Finland was acquired by Russia for a "warm-water" port giving access for its merchantmen and the buildup of a naval force, the city of St. Petersburg was built and developed an extensive port. The School of Mathematics and Navigation was moved to St. Petersburg and in 1752 it was renamed the Naval Cadet Corps. Today it is the St. Petersburg Naval Institute – Peter the Great Naval Corps.

The Baltic Fleet began to receive new vessels in 1703. The fleet's first vessel was the 24-gun three-masted frigate Shtandart. She was the fleet's flagship, and is a prime example of the increasing role of the frigate design.

By 1724, the fleet boasted 141 sail warships and hundreds of oar-propelled vessels (galleys).

During the Great Northern War, the Baltic Fleet assisted in taking Viborg, Tallinn, (Estonia), Riga, (Latvia), the West Estonian archipelago (Moonsund archipelago), Helsinki, (Finland), and Turku. The first claimed victories of the new Imperial Russian Navy were the Gangut (Swedish: Hangöudd) in 1714 and, arguably, the Grengam (Swedish: Ledsund) in 1720. From 1715, the English Royal Navy intervened in the Baltic Sea on behalf of the German principality of Hanover, (dynastic home of the current British monarchy) and more or less in a tacit alliance with Russia.

During the concluding stages of the war, the Russian fleet would land troops along the Swedish coast to devastate coastal settlements. However, after the death of King Charles XII, the Royal Navy would rather protect Swedish interests after a rapprochement between the Kingdom of Sweden and King George I. A Russian attempt to reach the Swedish capital of Stockholm was checked at the Battle of Stäket in 1719. The losses suffered by the Russian Navy at the Grengam in 1720, as well as the arrival of a Royal Navy squadron under Admiral John Norris, also prevented further operations of any greater scale before the war ended in 1721.

During the "Seven Years' War", (1756–1763), the Russian Baltic Sea fleet was active on the Pomeranian coast of northern Germany and Prussia, helping the infantry to take Memel in 1757 and Kolberg in 1761. The Oresund was blockaded in order to prevent the British Navy from entering the Baltic sea. During the Russo-Swedish War (1788–1790) the fleet, commanded by Samuel Greig, checked the Swedes at Hogland (1788) and the Viborg (1790). An impetuous Russian attack on the Swedish galley flotilla on 9 July 1790 at the Second Battle of Svensksund resulted in a disaster for the Russian Navy who lost some 9,500 out of 14,000 men and about one third of their flotilla. The Russian defeat in this battle effectively ended the war.

During the series of Russo-Turkish Wars, (1710–1711, 1735–1739, 1768–1774, 1787–1792, 1806–1812, 1828–1829), the fleet sailed into the Mediterranean Sea on the First and Second Archipelago Expeditions and destroyed the Ottoman Imperial Navy at the sea Battles of Chesma (1770), the Dardanelles (1807), Athos (1807), and Navarino (1827). At about the same time, Russian Admiral Ivan Krusenstern circumnavigated the globe, while another Baltic Fleet officer – Fabian Gottlieb von Bellingshausen – discovered the southern ice-covered continent, Antarctica.

In the Crimean War, (1853–1856), the fleet – although stymied in its operations by the absence of steamships – prevented the British and French Allies from occupying Hangö, Sveaborg, and Saint Petersburg. Despite being greatly outnumbered by the technologically superior Allies, it was the Russian Fleet that introduced into naval warfare such novelties as torpedo mines, invented by Boris Yakobi. Other outstanding inventors who served in the Baltic Fleet were Alexander Stepanovich Popov (who was the first to demonstrate the practical application of electromagnetic (radio) waves), Stepan Makarov (the first to launch torpedoes from a boat), Alexei Krylov (author of the modern ship floodability theory), and Alexander Mozhaiski (co-inventor of aircraft).

Age of iron
As early as 1861, the first armor-clad ships were built for the Baltic Fleet. In 1863, during the American Civil War, most of the fleet's ocean-going ships, including the flagship Alexander Nevsky were sent to New York City. At the same time ten Uragan-class monitors based on the American-designed Passaic-class monitors were launched.

It was the policy of the Tsar and his government to show support for the Northern Union Army in the United States during their Civil War, observing and exchanging naval tactics and cooperation. In 1869, the fleet commissioned the first turret on a battleship in the world – Petr Veliky. Furthermore, in the second half of the 19th and early 20th Century a strong network of coastal artillery batteries was created to cover the approaches to St. Petersburg, Riga, and other important bases.

Russo-Japanese War

By 1900, decades of modernization on the Baltic as well as the Pacific Fleet made Russia the fourth strongest country in the world in terms of naval forces after the UK, France and Germany, ahead of the US and Japan.
The Baltic Fleet, re-organized into the Second Pacific Squadron (route around Africa) and the Third Pacific Squadron (Suez route, under the command of Admiral Nebogatov), took a prominent part in the Russo-Japanese War. After the defeat of earlier Siberian Military Flotilla vessels, in September 1904, the Second Squadron under the command of Admiral Zinovy Rozhestvensky was sent on a high-speed dash around South Africa.

They stopped in French, German and Portuguese colonial ports: Tangier in Morocco, Dakar in Senegal, Gabon, Baía dos Tigres, Lüderitz Bay, and Nossi Be (Madagascar). They then formed a single fleet under the command of Rozhestvensky with the Third Pacific Fleet, across the Indian Ocean to Cam Ranh Bay in French Indochina and then northward to its doomed encounter with the Japanese fleet at the Battle of Tsushima off the east coast of Korea in May, 1905, ending the Russo-Japanese War.

The Imperial German civilian passenger Hamburg-Amerika Line provided 60 colliers to supply the Baltic Fleet on its journey. During its passage through the North Sea the fleet mistook a fleet of British fishing boats for Japanese torpedo boats and opened fire, killing three sailors in what is known as the Dogger Bank incident.

The decision to send the fleet to the Pacific was made after Russia had suffered a string of naval defeats in the East China Sea and the Sea of Japan off the coast of China and Korea near its Far East naval base and colony, at the hands of the newly emergent Imperial Japanese Navy and Army in Manchuria. The one-sided outcome of the Tsushima naval battle broke Russian strength in East Asia. It set the stage for the uprising in the abortive Russian Revolution of 1905. That propelled the decline that would see the Romanov dynasty monarchy eventually brought down with the strains of World War I, in the Russian Revolutions of 1917.

World War I 

Following the catastrophic losses in battleships during the Russo-Japanese War, Russia embarked on a new naval building program which was to incorporate a number of the most modern dreadnought-type battleships into the fleet along with other vessels and practices adopted from the Western navies. Four more powerful battlecruisers of the Borodino class were under construction, but were never completed. On the whole the heavy units of the fleet remained in port during the war, as the Imperial German Navy's superiority in battleships and other vessels was overwhelming and it was difficult to communicate with Great Britain's Royal Navy forces further west in the North Sea even though they had the Germans bottled up after the Battle of Jutland in 1916.

The Imperial Russian Navy's Baltic Fleet included a submarine division that had about 30 submarines of several classes and various auxiliary vessels, the largest of which were the transport and mother ships Europa, Tosno, Khabarovsk, Oland and Svjatitel Nikolai. Some of the fleet's 355-ton submarines were made by Electric Boat Company of Groton, Connecticut in the United States, main supplier and builder of subs for the U.S. Navy. Five of these "AG (Holland)" class submarines were prefabricated by the British Pacific Engineering & Construction Company at Barnet (near Vancouver), in Canada's British Columbia, also under contract to the Electric Boat Company. These Canadian-built subs were shipped to Russia, a fellow Ally in the First World War in December 1915.,

Four of these submarines, AG 11, AG 12, AG 15 and AG 16 were scuttled in the harbour of Hanko on 3 April 1918, just before the 10,000-strong Imperial German Baltic Sea Division landed in support of the "Whites" forces in the little known Finnish Civil War. During the war the fleet was aided by a detachment of British Royal Navy submarines. These subs were later scuttled by their crews near the Harmaja lighthouse outside Helsinki, Finland, on 4 April 1918.

Soviet era

October Revolution and Russian Civil War (1917–22)

During the October Revolution the sailors of the Baltic Fleet (renamed "Naval Forces of the Baltic Sea" in March 1918) were among the most ardent supporters of Bolsheviks, and formed an elite among Red military forces. The fleet was forced to evacuate several of its bases after Russia's withdrawal from the First World War, under the terms of the Treaty of Brest-Litovsk. The "Ice Cruise" of the Baltic Fleet (1918), led by Alexey Schastny who was later executed on Trotsky's orders, saw the evacuation of most of the fleet's ships to Kronstadt and Petrograd.

Some ships of the fleet took part in the Russian Civil War, notably by clashing with the British navy operating in the Baltic as part of intervention forces. Over the years, however, the relations of the Baltic Fleet sailors with the Bolshevik regime soured, and they eventually rebelled against the Soviet government in the Kronstadt rebellion in 1921, but were suppressed and executed, and the fleet de facto ceased to exist as an active military unit.

1922–1941
The fleet, renamed the Red-Banner Baltic Fleet on 11 January 1935, was developed further during the Soviet years, initially relying on pre-revolutionary warships, but adding modern units built in Soviet yards from the 1930s onwards. Among the fleet's Soviet commanders were Gordey Levchenko in 1938–39 and Arseniy Golovko in 1952–56. Ships and submarines commissioned to the fleet included Soviet submarine M-256, a Project 615 short-range attack diesel submarine of the Soviet Navy. The fleet also acquired a large number of ground-based aircraft to form a strong naval aviation force.

In September 1939, the fleet threatened the Baltic states as part of a series of military actions staged to encourage the Baltics to accept Soviet offers of "mutual assistance." Subsequently, in June 1940, the fleet blockaded the Baltics in support of the Soviet invasion.

Winter War
Finland, which had refused to sign a "pact of mutual assistance", was attacked by the USSR. The fleet played a limited role in the Winter War with Finland in 1939–1940, mostly through conducting artillery bombardments of Finnish coastal fortifications. Many fleet aircraft were involved in operations against Finland, however. Its operations came to a close with the freezing of the Gulf of Finland during the exceptionally cold winter of that year.

World War II

In the beginning of the German invasion the Baltic Fleet had 2 battleships (both of World War I vintage), 2 cruisers, 2 flotilla leaders, 19 destroyers, 48 MTBs, 65 submarines and other ships, and 656 aircraft. During the war, the fleet, commanded by the Vice-Admiral Vladimir Tributz, defended the Hanko Peninsula, Tallinn, several islands in Estonian SSR, and participated in the breakthrough breach of the Siege of Leningrad. 137 sailors of the Baltic Fleet were awarded a title of the Hero of the Soviet Union.

For most of the war the fleet was trapped by German and Finnish minefields in Leningrad and nearby Kronstadt, the only bases left in Soviet hands on the Baltic coast. Another key factor was that the Finns had recaptured outer islands of the Gulf of Finland, Suursaari being the most important of them. Many of the fleet sailors fought on land as infantry during the siege.

Only submarines could risk the passage into the open sea to strike at German shipping. They were particularly successful towards the end of the war, sinking ships like Wilhelm Gustloff, Steuben and Goya, causing great loss of life.

The fleet carried out the Soviet evacuation of Tallinn in late August 1941.

Grouping in June 1941
 Battleship squadron/division
 battleship Marat (named after Jean-Paul Marat)
 battleship Oktyabrskaya Revolutsiya (named after October revolution)
 destroyer leader Leningrad (named after the city of Leningrad)
 destroyer leader Minsk (named after the capital of Belarus)
 1st destroyer division/1 Flotilla
 cruiser Kirov
 destroyer Gnevny
 destroyer Gordyy
 destroyer Grozyashchiy
 destroyer Smetlivyi
 destroyer Steregushchy
 2nd destroyer division/2 Flotilla
 Serdity
 Silnyi
 Stoikiy
 Storozhevoy
 3rd destroyer division/3 Flotilla
 Karl Marx
 Volodarsky
 Lenin
 Yakov Sverdlov
 Artiom
 Engels
 Kalinin
 Guards division/Naval Guards Squadron
 Burya
 Sneg
 Taifun
 Tsiklon
 Tucha
 Vihr
Minesweeper Division/Task Group
 Minelayer Marti
 Minesweepers T-201, T-202, T-203, T-204, T-205, T-206, T-207, T-208, T-209, T-210, T-211, T-212, T-213, T-214, T-215, T-216, T-217 and T-218
 15 auxiliary minesweepers
1st submarine brigade/1 Submarine Battle Fleet
 S-1, S-3, S-4, S-5, S-6, S-7, S-8, S-9, S-10, S-101, S-102, L3, M-71, M-77, M-78, M-79, M-80, M-81, M-83, ex-Estonian submarine Lembit, ex-Estonian submarine Kalev, ex-, ex-
2nd submarine brigade/2 Submarine Battle Fleet
 Shch-309, Shch-310, Shch-311, Shch-317, Shch-318, Shch-319, Shch-320, Shch-322, Shch-323, Shch-324, M-90, M-94, M-95, M-96, M-97, M-98, M-99, M-102, M-103
 Support vessels
 transport Eestirand (VT 532)
 Oka (named after the river of Oka)
 Polyarnaya Zvezda (Polar Star)
 Training Task Group/Division of the Navy
 M-72, M-73, M-74, M-75, M-76, Shch-303, Shch-304, K-3, K-21, K-22, K-23, L-1, L-2, S-11, S-12, Shch-405, Shch-406
 Training Task Group
 Shch-301, Shch-302, Shch-305, Shch-306, Shch-307, Shch-308, P-1, P-2, P-3

Cold War

During the Immediate post-war period the importance of the Red-Banner Baltic Fleet increased despite the Baltic being a shallow sea with the exits easily becoming choke points by other countries. The Baltic Fleet was increased to two Fleets, the 4th Red-Banner Baltic Fleet and the 8th Red-Banner Baltic Fleet on 15 February 1946. However, during the post-Stalinist period and general reforms and downsizing in the Soviet Armed Forces the two fleets of the Baltic were again reduced, with many vessels, some built before the Revolution, were scrapped, and the fleet was again renamed Red-Banner Baltic Fleet on 24 December 1955.

In Liepāja the Baltic Fleet's 14th submarine squadron, call sign "Kompleks" ("Комплекс") was stationed with 16 submarines (613, 629a, 651); as was the 6th group of rear supply of Baltic Fleet, and the 81st design bureau and reserve command center of the same force.

Far from being reduced in importance, operations of the Red-Banner Baltic Fleet during the early-Cold War period earned it a great amount of prestige and profile, with the second awarding of the Order of Red Banner being presented on 7 May 1965 when the fleet was again renamed to Twice Red-Banner Baltic Fleet. Although the Soviet Union poured resources into building up the Northern Fleet and the Pacific Fleet, both of which had easy access to the open ocean, the Twice Red-Banner Baltic Fleet assumed the very important position of supporting the northern flank of the European Theatre in case of a confrontation with NATO.

This role was under-rated from the blue water navies perspective, but was seen as a highly valuable one from the strategic perspective of the Soviet General Staff planning. The Twice Red-Banner Baltic Fleet remained a powerful force, which in the event of war was tasked with conducting amphibious assaults against the coast of Denmark and Germany, in cooperation with allied Polish and East German naval forces.

A notable incident involving the fleet occurred in 1975 when a mutiny broke out on the frigate Storozhevoy. There were also numerous allegations by Sweden of Baltic Fleet submarines illegally penetrating its territorial waters. In October 1981, the Soviet Whiskey-class submarine U 137 ran aground in Swedish territorial waters, near the important naval base of Karlskrona, causing a serious diplomatic incident. Swedish naval vessels pulled the submarine into deeper water and permitted it to return to the Soviet fleet in early November.

Commanders

In 1946 the Baltic Fleet was split into two commands, the 4th and 8th Fleets

In 1956 the two fleets were reunited into a single Baltic Fleet command

Under the Russian Federation

The breakup of the Soviet Union deprived the fleet of key bases in Estonia, Latvia and Lithuania, leaving Kaliningrad Oblast as the fleet's only ice-free naval outlet to the Baltic Sea. However, the Kaliningrad Oblast between Poland and Lithuania is not contiguous with the rest of the national territory of the Russian Federation.

In the immediate post-Soviet period, the capabilities of the Baltic Fleet were significantly reduced. From 1991/1992 to 1994/95, vessels in the Baltic Fleet declined from 350 at the beginning of the decade to 109 available vessels. At the same time, with the dissolution of the Warsaw Pact, the formerly allied East German Navy was absorbed by West Germany and the Polish Navy no longer supplemented the strength of the Baltic Fleet.

Russian Land forces in the region were also sharply reduced. In 1989 3rd Guards Motor Rifle Division at Klaipeda was transferred to the fleet as a coastal defence division. It was disbanded on 1 September 1993. In the late 1990s the 336th Guards Naval Infantry Brigade and the remnant of the 11th Guards Army of the Baltic Military District were subordinated to a single command named the Ground and Coastal Forces of the Baltic Fleet under a deputy fleet commander.

The 11th Guards Army remnant included the 7th Guards Motor Rifle Regiment and the brigade that was the former 18th Guards Motor Rifle Division, plus several Bases for Storage of Weapons and Equipment, holding enough vehicles and weaponry for a division but only having a few hundred men assigned to maintain the equipment and guard the bases. "warfare.be" listings in 2013 report that the staff of the Ground and Coastal Defence Forces of the fleet may have been disbanded in November 2007. In 2007, according to the IISS, the fleet's aviation units were equipped with a total of 23 Su-27, 26 Su-24, 14 An-12/24/26, 2 An-12 Cub (MR/EW), 11 Mi-24 Hind, 19 Ka-28 Helix, 8 Ka-29 Helix assault helicopters, and 17 Mi-8 Hip transport helicopters. As of 2020, the 18th Guards Motorized Rifle Division was reconstituted, serving within the 13th Army Corps, headquartered in Kaliningrad.

As of 2008 the Baltic Fleet included about 75 combat ships of various types. The main base is in Baltiysk and a second operational base is in Kronstadt. The Leningrad Naval Base is an administrative entity that is not a discrete geographic location but comprises all of the naval institutions and facilities in the St. Petersburg area.

During the 2010s renewed emphasis was placed on modernizing Russian naval capabilities. In the Baltic, this process has proceeded slowly though there has been particular emphasis on acquiring new light units. New corvettes (of the Steregushchiy, Buyan-M and Karakurt classes) have been incrementally added to the fleet with additional vessels from the Karakurt, and potentially the Steregushchiy-class, anticipated in the 2020s - though not necessarily at a rate that will be sufficient to replace the fleet's older Soviet-era corvettes and missile boats on a one-for-one basis. Nevertheless, utilizing Russia's internal waterways, additional cruise missile-armed light units, drawn from Russia's other Western fleets or from the Caspian Flotilla, have the capacity to reinforce the Baltic Fleet as may be needed. A further aspect of modernization has focused on the build-up of Russian shore-based anti-ship and air defence capabilities in the Kaliningrad region.

In contrast to the three other Russian fleets, the Baltic Fleet's submarine capabilities are extremely modest with just one older Kilo-class boat deployed in 2020, largely for training purposes. Nevertheless, a strengthening of these capabilities in the 2020s was being considered with various options (including both Improved Kilos and/or new Lada-class submarines) apparently on the table.

Training and readiness levels have also been emphasized to be of key importance. In June 2016, fleet commander Vice Admiral Viktor Kravchuk and his chief of staff, Vice Admiral Sergei Popov, were dismissed for "serious training shortcomings and distortion of the real situation". N. G. Kuznetsov Naval Academy commander Vice Admiral Alexander Nosatov was made acting commander of the fleet, a position in which he was confirmed on 17 September.

Analysis undertaken by Anders Nielsen of the Royal Danish Defence College in 2019 concludes that the Russian Baltic Fleet is oriented to contributing to  Russian global deployment and expeditionary operations in peacetime. However, it is also the smallest of the Russian Navy's four principal fleets (in terms of surface warships and submarines combined) and therefore, due to its limited strength, would play primarily a defensive role in the Baltic Sea in most conflict or wartime scenarios.

On Russia's "Navy Day" on July 31, 2022, President Putin reportedly indicated that the Baltic Fleet was to be prioritized for modernization in the coming years. The pending entry of Sweden and Finland into NATO - in response to Russia's invasion of Ukraine - would significantly strengthen NATO naval forces in the Baltic, particularly taking into account the strength of the Swedish Navy's submarine fleet. Russian commentators suggested that a modernization and expansion of Russian submarine forces in the Baltic would therefore likely be a priority in the coming years.

An artillery regiment was said to have reinforced Russian ground troops in Kaliningrad on 1 December 2022. Deployed in Ukraine since the start of the invasion, the Baltic Fleet's 11th Army Corps is reported to have sustained heavy losses.

Order of Battle 
The Baltic Fleet is subordinate to Russia's Western Military District (headquartered in St. Petersburg) which also incorporates Russia's strongest ground and air formations. The Kaliningrad region serves as the principal base area for the Baltic Fleet and therefore hosts significant land and air forces, both to defend Kaliningrad and to extend Russian shore-based air and sea denial capabilities (A2/AD) into the Baltic Sea and region.

Surface Vessels and Submarines 

12th Surface ship Division
 128th Surface ship Brigade
 Nastoychivy (610) (Sovremenny-class destroyer) (1992) (Baltic fleet flagship; reported under repair as of 2019)
 Neustrashimy (Neustrashimy-class frigate) (Entered service 1993) (Rejoined the fleet in January 2023 pursuant to repairs which were completed as of December 2021)
 Yaroslav Mudry (Neustrashimy-class frigate) (Entered service 2009; active as of 2022)
 Steregushchiy (530) (Steregushchy-class multi-role corvette) (entered service in 2007; reported in modernization and upgrade refit as of early 2023)
 Soobrazitelnyy (531) (Steregushchy-class multi-role corvette) (active; deployed to the Mediterranean as of October 2022)
 Boikiy (532) (Steregushchy-class multi-role corvette) (entered service May 2013) (active as of 2022)
 Stoikiy (545) (Steregushchy-class multi-role corvette) (2014) (active; deployed to the Mediterranean as of October 2022)
 71st Red Star Landing Ship Brigade (Baltiysk)
 Minsk (122) (Ropucha class LST) (active as of 2022; deployed to the Black Sea and participating in invasion of Ukraine)
 Kaliningrad (102) (Ropucha class LST) (active as of 2022; deployed to the Black Sea and participating in the invasion of Ukraine)
 Aleksandr Shabalin (110) (Ropucha class LST)
 Korolev (130) (Ropucha class LST) (active as of 2022; deployed to the Black Sea and participating in the invasion of Ukraine)
 Evgeniy Kocheshkov (770) (Zubr-class LCAC) (active; refit completed 2021)
 Mordoviya (782) (Zubr-class LCAC) (active as of 2021)
 Other Landing Craft
 3 Dyugon-class landing craft
 2 Ondatra-class landing craft
 1 Serna-class landing craft
 2 BK-16-class (Project 02510) high-speed assault boats (entered service 2021)

Leningrad Naval Base
 123rd Submarine Brigade
 1 Kilo-class submarine (Dmitrov reported assigned to the Baltic Fleet as of 2020; active as of 2021)
 105th Naval Region Protection Brigade
 144th Tactical Group (Kronshtadt) ex 109th ASW ships div
 308 MPK 99 Zelenodolsk (Parchim-class corvette)
 304 MPK 192 Urengoy (Parchim-class corvette) (active as of 2022)
 311 MPK 205 Kazanets (Parchim-class corvette active as of 2022)
 145th Tactical Group (Kronshtadt) ex-22nd Red Banner Minesweeper Battalion
 Pavel Khenov (former BT 115) (561) (Sonya-class minesweeper) (active as of 2021)
 PDKA 89 PDKA 910 firefighting boats
 2 Lida-class inshore minesweepers (RT-57 and 248 - reported active as of 2021)
 Project 97 Icebreaker: Buran (active as of 2022)

Baltyysk Naval Base (Kaliningrad)
 64th Maritime Region Protection Brigade
 146th Tactical Group (former 264th Anti-submarine Warfare Battalion, Project 1331)
 218 MPK-224 Aleksin (Parchim-class corvette); active as of 2022
 243 MPK-227 Kabardino-Balkaria (Parchim-class corvette); active as of 2022
 232 MPK-229 Kalmykiya (Parchim-class corvette)
 147th, 148th Tactical Groups (former 323rd Minesweeper Division)
 3 Sonya-class minesweepers (Sergey Kolbasev (former BT-213), Novocheboksarsk (former BT-212 - active as of 2022) and Leonid Sobolev (former BT-230 - active as of 2022))
 3 Lida-class inshore minesweepers (Vasily Polyakov - former RT-252 - Leonid Perepech - former RT-231 -, Victor Sigalov - former RT-273 - latter two both active as of 2022)
 1 Alexandrit-class seagoing minesweeper
 "Alexander Obukhov" (507) (active as of 2022)
 36th Red Banner Order of Nakhimov Missile Ship Brigade
 3 Buyan-M-class missile ships (assigned to the Kaliningrad region as of 2016)
 "Serpukhov"
 "Zelenyy Dol" (active as of 2022)
 Grad (commissioned 29 December 2022)
 1st Guards Missile Boat Battalion
 Karakurt-class small missile ships (corvettes)
 "Mytishchi" (active as of 2022)
 "Sovetsk" (active)
 "Odintsovo" (active as of 2022)
 106th Small Missile Ship Battalion – attached from 1 June 1994. (Project 1234)
 Liven (551) (Nanuchka-class corvette)
 Geyzer (555) (Nanuchka-class corvette)
 Zyb (560) (Nanuchka-class corvette)
 Passat (570) (Nanuchka-class corvette) (active as of 2022)
 6 Tarantul-class corvettes (reported based in Kaliningrad region as of 2018; six units reported as of 2019)
 2 Project 12411T Molnaya (Tarantul II) vessels (Kuznetsk and R-257)
 4 Project 12411 Molnaya-M (Tarantul III) vessels (Chuvashiya, Dimitrovgrad, Zarechnyy and Morshansk - latter two vessels active as of 2022)

Other Vessels:

Patrol/Anti-Saboteur Boats
 3+1 Grachonok-class anti-saboteur ships (P-104 Nakhimovets, P-468, P-471 Vladimir Nosov plus 1 name unknown but may have been delivered November 2022)
 9 Raptor-class patrol boats: P-281, P-280 Yunarmeets Baltiki, P-344, P-415 Georgiy Potekhin, P-437 Grigory Davidenko, P-461, P-462, Evgeny Kolesnikov, Yunarmeets Moskvy
 Intelligence Vessels
 2 Alpinist-class vessels
 Syzran
 Zhigulevsk
 2 Vishnya-class intelligence ships:
 Fedor Golovin
 Vasiliy Tatishchev (active as of 2022)
 Baklan-class intelligence ship KSV-2168
Training Vessels
 Smolnyy-class training ship - 2 vessels (Smolnyy and Perekop)
Fleet Oilers/Support Vessels
 Altay-class: 2 vessels (Elnya and Kola; Kola active as of 2021)
 Project 304-class Repair Ships: 3 vessels (PM-30, PM-86, PM-82 - PM-82 deployed to the Mediterranean as of March 2022)
Hydrographic Survey Vessels
 Yug-class (Project 862): 1 vessel (Nikolay Matusevich)

Aviation and Air Defence Forces
 132nd Mixed Aviation Division: (HQ: Kaliningrad) (Information on fixed-wing fighter units updated to October 2019; helicopter/transport aircraft data may be older unless indicated)
 4th Separate Naval Attack Aviation Regiment (regiment re-established starting 2017): Two Squadrons (with Su-24 and 12 Su-30SM/SM2 - with Kh-61 anti-ship missile)
 689th Independent Fighter Aviation Regiment – Kaliningrad Chkalovsk Two Squadrons: operating Su-27SM (to re-equip with Su-35S/SM).
 125th Independent Helicopter Squadron – HQ at Chkalovsk – operating Mi-8, Mi-24 (this was the former 288th Independent Helicopter Regt of the 11th Guards Army and used to be at Nivenskoye)
 396th Independent Shipborne Anti-Submarine Helicopter Squadron – Donskoye Air Base – Ka-27/M, Ka-29; (Ka-27M model ASW helicopters reportedly added October 2018.)
 398th Independent Air Transport Squadron – HQ at Khrabrovo – An-2, An-12, An-24, An-26, Be-12, Mi-8.

 44th Air Defence Division
 183rd Guards Air Defence Missile Regiment (Two battalions with S-300P SAMs; four battalions with S-400 SAMs; six Pantsir-S1 SAM systems), in Gvardeysk
 1545th Air Defence Missile Regiment (Two battalions with S-400 SAMs), in Znamensk (both 183rd and 1545th Air Defence Regiments were equipped with S-400 SAM systems starting in 2019.)

Baltic Fleet Coastal Forces
 11th Army Corps (Gusev)
 18th Guards Motorized Rifle Division (HQ Gusev): formed in December 2020 and incorporating existing and new regiments. As of 2021 ground combat units reported deployed within the 18th Division include:
 275th Motorized Rifle Regiment
 280th Motorized Rifle Regiment
 79th Guards Motorized Rifle Regiment (former 79th Independent Guards Motorized Rifle Brigade reformed as a regiment - Sovetsk, Kaliningrad Oblast)
 11th Tank Regiment (Gusev, Kaliningrad Oblast) (Military Unit Number V/Ch (в/ч) 41611) (Equipped with T-72B Main Battle Tanks (upgrades of T-72s to B3M-standard underway as of 2019/20)
 20th Separate Reconnaissance Battalion (Sovetsk; formed 2020/21; Orlan-10 UAVs and "Sobolyatnik" and "Fara-VR" reconnaissance radars)
 22nd Guards Air Defence Missile Regiment (Tor M1/M2), in Kaliningrad

In 2022, elements of the 11th Army Corps and the 18th Mortor Rifle Division were reportedly heavily engaged in combat in from the start of the invasion of Ukraine. They are also reported to have sustained heavy losses.

 7th Independent Guards Motorized Rifle Regiment (Kaliningrad) (equipped with BMP-3 infantry fighting vehicles as of 2021; regiment reportedly retains independent status outside 18th Motorized Rifle Division)
 244th Artillery Brigade (2A36/BM-21/2S7M Malka self-propelled howitzers with Zoopark-1 counter-battery radars), BM-27 Uragan multiple rocket launchers (delivery initiated 2020) and 9P157-2 Khrizantema-S tank destroyers) in Kaliningrad
 Naval Infantry/Special Forces
 336th Guards Naval Infantry Brigade (Baltiysk)
 561st "Maritime Recon Point" (Special Forces battalion - HQ at Parusnoye)
 69th Guards Naval Engineer Regiment, in Gvardeysk
 Surface-to-Surface Missile Units
 152nd Guards Missile Brigade (9K720 Iskander-M), at Chernyakhovsk Air Base
 25th Coastal Defence Missile Brigade (BAL-E/K-300P Bastion-P/Monolit-BR coastal defence radars), at Donskoye Air Base
 Coastal missile defence unit (Bastion/Bal systems) being established in Kronshtadt, Leningrad Oblast under Baltic Fleet command as of 2021.
 299th Training Center of Coastal Forces, in Gvardeysk
 561st Reconnaissance Center, in Parusnoye
 742nd Communication Center, in Kaliningrad
 841st Independent Electronic Warfare Center, in Yantarny
 313th Special Detachment of Anti-Sabotage Forces and Means, in Baltiysk
 473rd Special Detachment of Anti-Sabotage Forces and Means, in Kronstadt

See also
 Baltic Fleet electoral district (Russian Constituent Assembly election, 1917)

References

 Richard Connaughton, 1988, 1991, 2003. "Rising Sun and Tumbling Bear: Russia's War With Japan". Cassell. .
 Jürgen Rohwer and Mikhail S. Monakov, Stalin's Ocean Going Fleet – Soviet Naval Strategy and Shipbuilding Programmes: 1935–1953, Frank Cass, 2001, .
 Gunnar Åselius, The Rise and Fall of the Soviet Navy in the Baltic, 1921–41, Routledge (UK), 2005, .

External links

 Baltic Fleet – Morskoyo Flota ( Naval Force) – Russian and Soviet Nuclear Forces
 Baltic Fleet list March 1917
 Demobbing [Corrigenda] — Manning of the 11th Army Corps, 2020 calculations

 
Russian fleets
Naval units and formations of the Soviet Union
Military units and formations established in 1702
Estonian Soviet Socialist Republic
History of Tallinn 
Military history of Estonia
Military history of the Baltic Sea
Kaliningrad
Russian Navy
Military units and formations awarded the Order of the Red Banner
1702 establishments in Russia